Gliophorus chromolimoneus is a species of agaric fungus in the family Hygrophoraceae found in New Zealand and Australia.

Description 
It is glutinous to the touch and some shade of pale to chrome yellow. The margin is striated and the texture membranaceous. The gills are adnate to decurrent and the same colour as the cap at first, but fade with age, and have a gelatinous thread. The spores are ellipsoid, smooth and inamyloid, and measure 7–9.5 x 4-6 µm. The basidia are 0-47 x 6-7 µm, and four-spored.

Ecology 
Gliophorus chromolimoneus is a common saprotrophic species of fungus, deriving its nutrition from decaying organic matter. The fruiting bodies appear between December and June among the leaf litter under Nothofagus, Kunzea ericoides and Leptospermum scoparium trees, or in mixed broad-leafed and conifer woodland with Dacrydium cupressinum, Metrosideros umbellata and Podocarpus laetus. It sometimes grows on mossy banks and occasionally on rotten wood.

References

External links 
 

Hygrophoraceae
Fungi of New Zealand
Fungi of Australia